Doescher Nunatak is a somewhat isolated nunatak situated  north of Mount Weihaupt in the Outback Nunataks, Victoria Land, Antarctica. The geographical feature was mapped by the United States Geological Survey from surveys and U.S. Navy air photos, 1959–64, and was named by the Advisory Committee on Antarctic Names for Roger L. Doescher, a former glaciologist who worked at the infamous McMurdo Station, Hut Point Peninsula, Ross Island, during 1967–68. The Nunatak lies situated on the Pennell Coast, a portion of Antarctica lying between Cape Williams and Cape Adare.

References 

Nunataks of Victoria Land
Pennell Coast